James Andre Woods (born 30 October 1979) is a Canadian actor, who has appeared in films, television and video games.

Early life and education 
Woods trained at New York City's Lee Strasberg Theatre and Film Institute before returning to his native Montreal to pursue an acting career.

Career 
Woods starred in Hatley High, distributed in Canada by Seville Films and winner of Best Director and Best Screenplay awards at The Comedy Festival. Additional film credits include the TVA Films theatrical release Eternal and the Ed Solomon directed Levity. He also starred in The Watch (2008).

Woods' television credits include Seriously Weird (YTV/ITV), Big Wolf on Campus (Fox Family), Undressed (MTV), Fries with That? (Télé-Action), Naked Josh (Showcase/Oxygen) and Galidor (Fox Kids).

Woods has worked with Ubisoft on their award-winning games. As particularly in, Tom Clancy's Splinter Cell: Conviction as the antagonistic Thomas Reed, and twice in Far Cry franchise, starting in Far Cry 3 as Keith Ramsay, and Far Cry 4 as the protagonist Ajay Ghale. Woods later performed in 2016's Deus Ex: Mankind Divided as antagonist Viktor Marchenko.

Filmography

Film

Television

Video games

External links 
 

1979 births
Living people
Canadian male film actors
Canadian male television actors
Canadian male voice actors
Male actors from Montreal
Anglophone Quebec people